Gonzalo Agustín Lamardo (born 25 April 1997) is an Argentine professional footballer who plays as an attacking midfielder for Alvarado.

Career
Lamardo arrived to the Boca Juniors youth ranks in 2013 after a spell with Club La Ribera, prior to making his professional career debut on 3 December 2017 in a 2–0 win in the Primera División against Arsenal de Sarandí. Lamardo departed on loan in January 2019, signing for fellow Primera División team San Martín.

Personal life
In November 2018, whilst travelling to face River Plate in the 2018 Copa Libertadores finals, Lamardo reportedly suffered a head laceration from broken glass after Boca's team bus was attacked.

Career statistics
.

Honours
Boca Juniors
Primera División: 2017–18

References

External links

1997 births
Living people
Argentine footballers
Argentine expatriate footballers
Sportspeople from Buenos Aires Province
People from Lincoln Partido
Association football midfielders
Boca Juniors footballers
San Martín de Tucumán footballers
Cerro Largo F.C. players
Club Atlético Alvarado players
Argentine Primera División players
Primera Nacional players
Uruguayan Primera División players
Argentine expatriate sportspeople in Uruguay
Expatriate footballers in Uruguay